Sporting Club de Bel-Abbès, known as SC Bel-Abbès or simply SCBA for a short, is a French Algerian defunct football club founded in 1906 in Sidi Bel Abbès. It's considered as the most successful North African club before 1962 under the French colonisation.

History

The club was founded on 1906 by Georges Lhermine (who became the first president of the club) and Edmond Veith in Sidi Bel Abbès. It holds the record for the most titles won in North Africa under French colonisation.

The club was dissolved in 1962 after the independence of Algeria.

Stadium
The club played in Stade Paul André (ex. Stade des Oliviers). After 1962 the stadium was renamed Three Amarouch Brothers Stadium (Stade des Trois Frères Amarouch). It have a capacity of 7,000 places.

Achievements

National
League of Oran
Champion (15): 1921–22, 1922–23, 1923–24, 1924–25, 1925–26, 1926–27, 1927–28, 1946–47, 1951–52, 1952–53, 1953–54, 1954–55, 1955–56, 1956–57, 1957–58

Algerian Championship CFA
Champion (1): 1960
Runner-up: 1961

Algerian Cup (FFF)
Winner (3): 1958, 1959, 1960.

Regional
North African Championship
Champion (7): 1922, 1924, 1925, 1926, 1927, 1953, 1954
Runner-up (3): 1923, 1928, 1947

North African Cup
Champion (2): 1951, 1955
Runner-up (2): 1950, 1956

Notable players

Robert Gomez
André Liminana
Joseph Rodriguez
Emmanuel Aznar
Sauveur Rodriguez
Slimane Benyamina
Djillali Aber
Joseph "Jobic" Lepage
Amato Olmiccia
Marion

Serge Guttierez
Cascalès
Di Orio
Georges Taillepierre
Hubert Gros
Saïd Amara
Yung
Ploner

External links
Club profile – Footballdatabase

Football clubs in Algeria
Defunct football clubs in Algeria
Association football clubs established in 1906
Association football clubs disestablished in 1962
1906 establishments in Algeria